Adrian Allen Leppard,  (born 11 February 1962) is a retired senior British police officer and a former Commissioner of the City of London Police. He was previously Deputy Chief Constable of Kent Police and also served as a detective with Surrey Police.

Early life and education
Leppard was born on 11 February 1962 in Surrey, England. In 2000, he graduated from City University London with a Master of Business Administration (MBA). Starting in 2003, Leppard also earned a degree in Criminology at Fitzwilliam College, Cambridge.

Police career

Lepppard began his police in 1984 when he joined Surrey Police as a constable. He served as a traffic officer in the early years of his career. In 1989, he was promoted to sergeant and trained as a detective. As a senior investigating officer, he investigated a number of murders including the contract killing of Mario Commatteo. By 2003, he has risen to become the area commander of North West Surrey in the rank of chief superintendent.

In 2005, he transferred to Kent Police as an assistant chief constable with responsibly for specialist operations. In September 2005, he became assistant chief constable with responsibly for area operations. He led the investigation into the Securitas depot robbery that had occurred in February 2006. In December 2007, he was promoted to deputy chief constable. From March until July 2010, he was serving as temporary chief constable of the force.

In January 2011, he left Kent Police to join the City of London Police as Commissioner. In addition to leading the City's police, he was head of the National Fraud Intelligence Bureau. In the 2012 New Year Honours, he was awarded the Queen's Police Medal. He retired on 31 December 2015 and was succeeded by the force's Assistant Commissioner, Ian Dyson, QPM.

Leppard was appointed Commander of the Order of the British Empire (CBE) in the 2016 Birthday Honours for services to policing and the prevention of economic crime.

Personal life
Leppard has raised at least $1 million for charity. In January 2013, he took part in the Wings of Kilimanjaro, a charity event that involved climbing Mount Kilimanjaro and paragliding off the top.

Honours

References

External links
Biography – City of London Police

 

 
 
 

Commissioners of the City of London Police
British police chief officers
People from Surrey
Alumni of City, University of London
Alumni of Fitzwilliam College, Cambridge
English recipients of the Queen's Police Medal
Living people
Paraglider pilots
Commanders of the Order of the British Empire
1962 births